Surgery is a medical specialty that uses operative treatment.

Surgery may also refer to:

Medicine
 Operating theater, where surgery is performed, or the offices of the practitioner, the surgeon
 Doctor's surgery, British term for a doctor's office, a facility in which a general practitioner sees patients
 Surgery (journal), a medical journal

Mathematics
 Surgery theory, a mathematical operation used in topology; two special cases are:
 Dehn surgery
 Hyperbolic Dehn surgery

Arts, entertainment, and media
 Surgery (band), an American noise rock band
The Surgery, a weekly radio show on BBC Radio 1
 Surgery (album), a 2005 album by The Warlocks
 "Surgery", a song by Robyn Hitchcock on his compilation album You & Oblivion
"Surgery", a song by Jack Off Jill on their album Clear Hearts Grey Flowers
"Surgery", a song by Two Door Cinema Club on their album Gameshow
 "Surgery" (short story), a short story by Anton Chekhov

Other uses
 Surgery (politics), a series of one-to-one meetings that a political officeholder may have with his or her constituents